The Ruth Stone House is a historic house at 788 Hathaway Road in Goshen, Vermont.  This 19th-century farmhouse was for many years the home of poet Ruth Stone (1915-2011).  Since her death, the property has been taken over by the Ruth Stone Foundation, established in 2013 to manage her legacy.  The organization's intent is to establish the house as a writer's retreat.  It was listed on the National Register of Historic Places in 2016.

Description and history
The Ruth Stone property straddles Hathaway Road, a gravel road in the rural mountain community of Goshen, Vermont. The main house, a vernacular farmhouse built about 1830, is located on the south side of Hathaway Road, with the informally marked grave of Ruth Stone nearby to the southwest. Across Hathaway Road are two other buildings: the "Little House", apparently an early 19th-century barn converted into residential use, and the "Chapel", a 20th-century vernacular structure built using salvage materials by Stone's family and friends as a studio and retreat.

The property was the principal residence of poet Ruth Stone from 1956 until her death in 2011.  Stone's work went largely unrecognized until late in her life, when she won two National Book Awards, Guggenheim Fellowships, and was Vermont's poet laureate 2007–11.  It was here that she wrote much of her poetry, and worked with budding writers and poets.  Of Vermont's well-known poets, it is distinctive as a singular place associated with her life and work.

See also
National Register of Historic Places listings in Addison County, Vermont

References

External links 
 Ruth Stone Foundation

Houses on the National Register of Historic Places in Vermont
National Register of Historic Places in Addison County, Vermont
Houses in Addison County, Vermont
Buildings and structures in Goshen, Vermont